Bradley Robert Maxwell (born July 8, 1957) is a Canadian former professional ice hockey player renowned as a playmaking defenceman. He featured in the 1981 Stanley Cup Finals with the Minnesota North Stars.

After having won the Memorial Cup in 1977 as a member of the New Westminster Bruins, Maxwell was selected seventh overall in the 1977 NHL amateur draft by the Minnesota North Stars. He stayed with the North Stars throughout the early 1980s, recording 73 points in 78 games in his best season with the club in 1983–84. At the end of his career he bounced around between teams, spending short amounts of time with the Quebec Nordiques, Toronto Maple Leafs, Vancouver Canucks and New York Rangers, and ultimately retired in 1987.

According to Maxwell, his final trade, from the Rangers back to the North Stars, came about after Rangers general manager Phil Esposito lost a card game to North Stars general manager Lou Nanne.

Post-playing career
After retiring from hockey, Maxwell started his own business in Minnesota, Brad Maxwell Cabinets & Construction. Maxwell also organizes and plays with members of the North Stars alumni for charity games, and organized the North Stars alumni contingent for the 2016 NHL Stadium Series, which featured the Minnesota Wild hosting the Chicago Blackhawks, preceded by Blackhawks alumni facing a team comprising North Stars and Wild alumni.

Career statistics

Regular season and playoffs

International

Awards
 WCHL Second All-Star Team – 1976 & 1977

References

External links

1957 births
Living people
Birmingham Bulls draft picks
Canadian ice hockey defencemen
Ice hockey people from Manitoba
Kitchener Rangers players
Minnesota North Stars draft picks
Minnesota North Stars players
National Hockey League All-Stars
National Hockey League first-round draft picks
New Westminster Bruins players
New York Rangers players
Oklahoma City Stars players
Quebec Nordiques players
Sportspeople from Brandon, Manitoba
Toronto Maple Leafs players
Vancouver Canucks players